Main Directorate of Intelligence may refer to:

 GRU, Russia
 GRU (Soviet Union)
 Main Directorate of Intelligence (Ukraine)